Taylorsville Lake State Park is a park encompassing  in Spencer County, Kentucky, roughly midway between Louisville and Lexington. Taylorsville Lake, its major feature, extends into parts of Anderson County and Nelson County.

Taylorsville Lake gains its name from the nearby town, named for President Zachary Taylor's father, Richard Taylor, who donated  of his own land for creation of the town. The lake was created when the United States Army Corps of Engineers chose to dam the Salt River, thereby creating the lake, with its public opening in January 1983.

Activities and amenities
There is both a park office, maintained by the state of Kentucky, and a visitors center maintained by the United States Army Corps of Engineers.  The visitors center is pyramid-shaped with a brown metal roof, and contains displays of the local trees, boating, and dam management.

Fishing is the main attraction, as Taylorsville Lake is the most heavily stocked lake in the Commonwealth of Kentucky; it is known for its bluegill, and features bass and crappie.

There are also  of hiking trails in the park, but these are seen as poor quality by hiking enthusiasts as their use by equestrian traffic has made the hiking trails like "a plow had chattered down them".  Camping was not available at the park until 1998.

References

External links
Taylorsville Lake State Park Kentucky Department of Parks

Protected areas of Anderson County, Kentucky
State parks of Kentucky
Protected areas of Nelson County, Kentucky
Protected areas of Spencer County, Kentucky
Protected areas established in 1983
1983 establishments in Kentucky
Salt River (Kentucky)